Radha Raman Shastri is a former Speaker of the Legislative Assembly of Himachal Pradesh and Education Minister of Himachal Pradesh.

Shastri was born on 23 March 1943 at village Sunog in Tehsil Chopal in the Shimla district of Himachal Pradesh. He started his career as Sanskrit teacher in Himachal Pradesh Education Department, served only for 8 years and was selected as lecturer for College Cadre but resigned to participate in social and political activities.

He established two periodicals namely " HIMBALA " monthly and " HIMYUVAK " weekly and edited successfully for 9 years. Digvijay Printing Press owned by him was raided during emergency by police 9 times and both the periodicals had to be stopped as these were being printed in his own Press.

During emergency in 1975, he was arrested under Maintenance of Indian Security Act (MISA) and remained in Central Jail Nahan with other most senior leaders for 19 months.

He was elected to Himachal Pradesh state assembly in 1977 immediately after the release from jail,
and was made chairman of Himachal Pradesh State Tourism Development Corporation, where he envisaged Master Plan to boost the tourism in the State.
He was also president of Janta Party District Shimla immediately after its formation.

He remained as General Secretary of Bhartiya Janta Party, 
Himachal Pradesh continuously for 10 years w.e.f. 6 April 1980 to March 1990,
and founded Snatan Dharm Degree College in the interiors of District Shimla at Nerwa (Chopal), which has been serving the people of this area by uplifting students educationally from weaker sections of different societies.

Again he was elected as a member of State Legislative Assembly in 1990 and was elected Speaker of HP State Assembly. After this he was given an opportunity of becoming Education Minister of Himachal Pradesh with 6 portfolios. He had the chance to visit many countries in the world and got opportunities to deliver lectures on different topics of Social, Educational and Political concerns. He participated in international seminars also.

He wrote two reference books namely " MAHASU KSHETRA KI LOK PARAMPRAYAIN " and " SITUATIONAL STUDY OF TRIBAL AREAS OF HIMACHAL PRADESH ". Now both the reference books are property of Government of India.

References 

http://www.tribuneindia.com/2004/20040327/himachal.htm#2
http://www.newkerala.com/news/newsplus/worldnews-84240.html#.UelyENKNnQs
http://www.indiainfoline.com/Markets/News/Journalist-Association-announces-18th-National-Award/4924551940
http://legislativebodiesinindia.nic.in/STATISTICAL/himachal.htm
https://books.google.com/books?id=LBwOP9klFaQC&pg=PA249&lpg=PA249&dq=dr+radha+raman+shastri&source=bl&ots=FC-BG-cmkX&sig=NqRMRNAf5VWk7hRyTzP9XEAps5w&hl=en&sa=X&ei=1AT6Ur-mJIbsrAei-4CgAg&ved=0CC0Q6AEwATgK#v=onepage&q=dr%20radha%20raman%20shastri&f=false

Year of birth missing (living people)
Living people
Speakers of the Himachal Pradesh Legislative Assembly
People from Shimla district
Nationalist Congress Party politicians from Himachal Pradesh
Indian politicians convicted of crimes
Bharatiya Janata Party politicians from Himachal Pradesh